The Radura is the international symbol indicating a food product has been irradiated. The Radura is usually green and resembles a plant in circle.  The top half of the circle is dashed. Graphical details and colours vary between countries.

Meaning of the word "Radura" 
The word "Radura" is derived from radurization, in itself a portmanteau combining the initial letters of the word "radiation" with the stem of "durus", the Latin word for hard, lasting.

History 
The inventors of the symbol Radura - knowing this proposal for a new terminology - came from the former Pilot Plant for Food Irradiation, Wageningen, Netherlands, which was the nucleus for the later Gammaster today known as Isotron. The director at the time, R.M. Ulmann, introduced this symbol to the international community. Ulmann in his lecture also provided the interpretation of this symbol: denoting food - as an agricultural product - i.e., a plant (dot and two leaves) in a closed package (the circle) - irradiated from top through the package by penetrating ionizing rays (the breaks in the upper part of the circle).

The Radura was originally used in the 1960s exclusively by a pilot plant for food irradiation in Wageningen, Netherlands that owned the copyright. Jan Leemhorst, then president of Gammaster, untiringly propagated the use of this logo internationally. The use of the logo was permitted to everybody adhering to the same rules of quality. The symbol was also widely used by Atomic Energy of South Africa, including the labelling by the term 'radurized' instead of irradiated. By his intervention, the new logo was also included in the Codex Alimentarius Standard on irradiated food as an option to label irradiated food. Today it is found in the Codex Alimentarius Standard on Labelling of Prepacked Food.

Usage 
The symbol Radura was originally used as a symbol of quality for food processed by ionizing radiation. The Dutch pilot plant used the logo as an identification of irradiated products and as a promotion tool for a high quality product with extended shelf life. In supermarkets where the irradiated mushrooms were on sale the logo was dominantly shown and buyers received a leaflet with information about the process and the advantages of the treated products. In clearances for other products granted by the Dutch authorities at later dates, application of the logo on the product or a clearly visible logo near treated bulk product was even demanded.

Symbolism 
Following the later interpretation by some food and process engineers, the symbol may also be read the following way:

- The central dot is the radiation source. - The two circle segments ('leaves') are the biological shield to protect the workers and the environment. - The outer ring is the transport system, the lower half of it is shielded from radiation by the biological shield and resembles also the loading area, the upper broken half symbolizes the rays hitting the target goods on the transport system.

Perception 
Perceptions of the Radura are often intertwined with common misconceptions of irradiation. Irradiation of food has not been widely adopted in the state of New York due to negative public perceptions, concerns expressed by some consumer groups and the reluctance of many food producers. Proponents of food irradiation have been frustrated by proposals to use international warning symbols for radiation hazard or bio-hazard since irradiated food does not pose any radiological or biological hazards.

The European Community does not provide for the use of the Radura logo and relies exclusively on labeling by the appropriate phrases in the respective languages of the Member States. Furthermore, irradiated ingredients have to be labeled even down to the last molecule contained in the final product; it is also required that restaurant food is labeled according to the same rule. Other countries and regions have varying regulations.

As part of its approval, the U.S. Food and Drug Administration (FDA) requires since 1986 that irradiated foods include labeling with either the statement "treated with radiation" or "treated by irradiation," along with the Radura.  In the USA, irradiation labeling requirements apply only to foods sold in stores. For example, irradiated spices or fresh strawberries should be labeled. Irradiation labeling does not apply to restaurant foods or processed foods. (NOTE: The Radura symbol as compulsory under FDA-rule has a design slightly different from the Codex Alimentarius version; the 'leaves' being empty areas.)

Such requirements are seen by consumer groups as helpful information to consumers concerned about food irradiation.

References

External links
 Food Irradiation: What You Need to Know

Certification marks
Food and Drug Administration
Food preservation
Radiation